The arrondissement of Mayenne is an arrondissement of France in the Mayenne department in the Pays de la Loire region. It has 132 communes.

Composition

The communes of the arrondissement of Mayenne, and their INSEE codes, are:

 Alexain (53002)
 Ambrières-les-Vallées (53003)
 Andouillé (53005)
 Aron (53008)
 Assé-le-Bérenger (53010)
 Averton (53013)
 La Baconnière (53015)
 Bais (53016)
 La Bazoge-Montpinçon (53021)
 La Bazouge-des-Alleux (53023)
 Belgeard (53028)
 La Bigottière (53031)
 Blandouet-Saint Jean (53228)
 Boulay-les-Ifs (53038)
 Brecé (53042)
 Brée (53043)
 Carelles (53047)
 Chailland (53048)
 Champéon (53051)
 Champfrémont (53052)
 Champgenéteux (53053)
 Chantrigné (53055)
 La Chapelle-au-Riboul (53057)
 La Chapelle-Rainsouin (53059)
 Charchigné (53061)
 Châtillon-sur-Colmont (53064)
 Chevaigné-du-Maine (53069)
 Colombiers-du-Plessis (53071)
 Commer (53072)
 Contest (53074)
 Couesmes-Vaucé (53079)
 Couptrain (53080)
 Courcité (53083)
 Crennes-sur-Fraubée (53085)
 La Croixille (53086)
 Désertines (53091)
 La Dorée (53093)
 Ernée (53096)
 Évron (53097)
 Fougerolles-du-Plessis (53100)
 Gesnes (53105)
 Gesvres (53106)
 Gorron (53107)
 Grazay (53109)
 La Haie-Traversaine (53111)
 Le Ham (53112)
 Hambers (53113)
 Hardanges (53114)
 Hercé (53115)
 Le Horps (53116)
 Le Housseau-Brétignolles (53118)
 Izé (53120)
 Javron-les-Chapelles (53121)
 Jublains (53122)
 Juvigné (53123)
 Landivy (53125)
 Larchamp (53126)
 Lassay-les-Châteaux (53127)
 Lesbois (53131)
 Levaré (53132)
 Lignières-Orgères (53133)
 Livet (53134)
 Loupfougères (53139)
 Madré (53142)
 Marcillé-la-Ville (53144)
 Martigné-sur-Mayenne (53146)
 Mayenne (53147)
 Mézangers (53153)
 Montaudin (53154)
 Montenay (53155)
 Montreuil-Poulay (53160)
 Montsûrs (53161)
 Moulay (53162)
 Neau (53163)
 Neuilly-le-Vendin (53164)
 Oisseau (53170)
 La Pallu (53173)
 Parigné-sur-Braye (53174)
 Le Pas (53176)
 La Pellerine (53177)
 Placé (53179)
 Pontmain (53181)
 Pré-en-Pail-Saint-Samson (53185)
 Ravigny (53187)
 Rennes-en-Grenouilles (53189)
 Le Ribay (53190)
 Sacé (53195)
 Saint-Aignan-de-Couptrain (53196)
 Saint-Aubin-du-Désert (53198)
 Saint-Aubin-Fosse-Louvain (53199)
 Saint-Baudelle (53200)
 Saint-Berthevin-la-Tannière (53202)
 Saint-Calais-du-Désert (53204)
 Saint-Cyr-en-Pail (53208)
 Saint-Denis-de-Gastines (53211)
 Sainte-Gemmes-le-Robert (53218)
 Saint-Ellier-du-Maine (53213)
 Sainte-Marie-du-Bois (53235)
 Sainte-Suzanne-et-Chammes (53255)
 Saint-Fraimbault-de-Prières (53216)
 Saint-Georges-Buttavent (53219)
 Saint-Georges-le-Fléchard (53220)
 Saint-Georges-sur-Erve (53221)
 Saint-Germain-d'Anxure (53222)
 Saint-Germain-de-Coulamer (53223)
 Saint-Germain-le-Guillaume (53225)
 Saint-Hilaire-du-Maine (53226)
 Saint-Julien-du-Terroux (53230)
 Saint-Léger (53232)
 Saint-Loup-du-Gast (53234)
 Saint-Mars-du-Désert (53236)
 Saint-Mars-sur-Colmont (53237)
 Saint-Mars-sur-la-Futaie (53238)
 Saint-Pierre-des-Landes (53245)
 Saint-Pierre-des-Nids (53246)
 Saint-Pierre-sur-Erve (53248)
 Saint-Thomas-de-Courceriers (53256)
 Saulges (53257)
 Soucé (53261)
 Thorigné-en-Charnie (53264)
 Thubœuf (53263)
 Torcé-Viviers-en-Charnie (53265)
 Trans (53266)
 Vaiges (53267)
 Vautorte (53269)
 Vieuvy (53270)
 Villaines-la-Juhel (53271)
 Villepail (53272)
 Vimartin-sur-Orthe (53239)
 Voutré (53276)

History

The arrondissement of Mayenne was created in 1800. At the March 2016 reorganisation of the arrondissements of Mayenne, it gained 38 communes from the arrondissement of Laval.

As a result of the reorganisation of the cantons of France which came into effect in 2015, the borders of the cantons are no longer related to the borders of the arrondissements. The cantons of the arrondissement of Mayenne were, as of January 2015:

 Ambrières-les-Vallées
 Bais
 Couptrain
 Ernée
 Gorron
 Le Horps
 Landivy
 Lassay-les-Châteaux
 Mayenne-Est
 Mayenne-Ouest
 Pré-en-Pail
 Villaines-la-Juhel

References

Mayenne